Nathaniel Whiting may refer to:

Nathaniel Whiting (mill owner) (1609–1682), American colonial settler of Dedham, Massachusetts
Nathaniel N. Whiting (1792–1872), American Baptist preacher in New York

See also
Nathaniel White (disambiguation)